Shame + A Sin is an album by the American musician Robert Cray. It was released in 1993 by Mercury Records.

Production
The album was produced by Cray. "You're Gonna Need Me" is a cover of the Albert King song.

Critical reception

The Indianapolis Star noted that "Cray uses the blues to inspire, strike an attitude and, gee, even have some fun." The Calgary Herald deemed the album "still more downtown professional than lunch-bucket working class."

Track listing
All tracks composed by Robert Cray; except where indicated
 "1040 Blues"- 5:04
 "Some Pain, Some Shame"-4:30
 "I Shiver"- 5:12
 "You're Gonna Need Me" (Albert King) - 3:38
 "Don't Break This Ring"- 4:55
 "Stay Go" (Cray, Jim Pugh, Karl Sevareid) - 3:38
 "Leave Well Enough Alone"- 5:20
 "Passing By"-5:12
 "I'm Just Lucky That Way" (Rick Estrin, Jim Pugh, Donnie Woodruff) - 4:00
 "Well I Lied" (Kevin Hayes, Chris Hayes) - 2:49
 "Up and Down" (Cray, Jim Pugh) - 6:39

Credits
Mike Kappus - executive producer

References

Robert Cray albums
1993 albums
Mercury Records albums